Karl Ahrens (13 March 1924 – 6 March 2015) was a German Social Democratic Party politician who served as member of the German Bundestag from 1969 to 1990. He had a doctorate in law and was an assistant secretary of the Lower-Saxon ministry of the interior. As a member of the Bundestag, he worked mainly in the committee on economic affairs.
Ahrens was president of the Association of European Border Regions from 1984 to 1996. He served as president of the Parliamentary Assembly of the Council of Europe from 1983 to 1986  and was the first German to do so.

References 

1924 births
2015 deaths
Members of the Bundestag 1969–1972
Members of the Bundestag 1976–1980
Members of the Bundestag 1980–1983
Members of the Bundestag 1983–1987
Members of the Bundestag 1987–1990
Members of the Parliamentary Assembly of the Council of Europe
Members of the Bundestag for the Social Democratic Party of Germany
20th-century German politicians
20th-century German lawyers